Trophos was a biopharmaceutical company specialising in the discovery and development of novel therapeutics to treat both orphan neurodegenerative diseases and more prevalent disorders.

Trophos was founded in 1999 in Marseille by three scientists: Christopher Henderson, Olivier Pourquie and Jean-Louis Kraus, and two entrepreneurs: Antoine Beret and Michel Delaage. Trophos' lead compound was olesoxime (TRO19622), a mitochondrial targeted compound developed to treat neurodegenerative diseases.

The deal was completed shortly afterwards.

References

Further reading

Roche
Defunct companies of France
French companies established in 1999
Pharmaceutical companies established in 1999
Pharmaceutical companies disestablished in 2015
French companies disestablished in 2015
Companies based in Marseille